Kashiram Vechan Pawara is a member of the 13th Maharashtra Legislative Assembly. He represents the Shirpur Assembly Constituency. He joined Bharatiya Janata Party ahead of 2019 Maharashtra Legislative Assembly election. Pawara was also Member of Legislative Assembly from Shirpur in 2009. He belonged to the INC then too. Now Kashiram Pawara joins BJP.

Personal life
He is from Sule Kangai village in Dhule District, Maharashtra. Once he visited Kangai village, he started the speech about his development program. He said "I wasted my five years for understanding what is politics, now this time give me vote for your valuable development".

References

Maharashtra MLAs 2014–2019
People from Dhule district
Marathi politicians
Living people
Year of birth missing (living people)
Indian National Congress politicians from Maharashtra
Bharatiya Janata Party politicians from Maharashtra
Maharashtra MLAs 2019–2024